Air Commodore George Michael Boddy,   was a senior Royal Air Force officer in the 1980s and the Commandant Royal Observer Corps.

References

Royal Air Force officers
People of the Royal Observer Corps
Officers of the Order of the British Empire
Living people
1937 births